Nasser Takmil Homayoun (23 November 1936 – 16 November 2022) was an Iranian historian.

Takmil Homayoun was born in Qazvin on 23 November 1936. He received two PhDs, one in history (1972) and another in Sociology (1977) from the Sorbonne in France.

Some of his works include The Social and Cultural History of Tehran (in three volumes), The Educational systems and Institutions in ancient Iran, six volumes in the "What do I know about Iran" series, as well as over 50 published articles in various publications.

Takmil Homayoun died on 16 November 2022, at the age of 85.

References

See also
Higher Education in Iran
Modern Iranian scientists, scholars, and engineers

1936 births
2022 deaths
Iranian Iranologists
Iranian sociologists
20th-century Iranian historians
People from Qazvin
University of Paris alumni
Paris-Sorbonne University alumni
Nation Party of Iran politicians
National Front (Iran) politicians
Faculty of Social Sciences of the University of Tehran alumni
21st-century Iranian historians